Kuliai eldership is an eldership in Plungė District Municipality to the southwest from Plungė. The administrative center is Kuliai.

Largest towns and villages 
Kuliai
Kumžaičiai
Šiemuliai

Other villages

References 

Elderships in Plungė District Municipality